Charles Philip Snyder (June 9, 1847 – August 21, 1915) was a lawyer, judge and Democratic politician from West Virginia, who represented West Virginia's 3rd congressional district during the 48th, 49th, and 50th United States Congresses. .

Early and family life

He was born on  June 9, 1847, in Charleston in Kanawha County, which was then in Virginia.

Career

After studying law, he was admitted to the bar and opened a practice. He became prosecuting attorney of Kanawha County and served from 1876 to 1884. He was elected in 1882 to the Forty-eighth Congress to fill the vacancy caused by the resignation of John E. Kenna He won re-election to the Forty-ninth and Fiftieth Congresses and served from May 15, 1883, to March 3, 1889. He served as a judge on the criminal court of Kanawha County from 1890 to 1896. He was named United States consul to Ciudad Porfirio Diaz, Mexico, from 1897 to 1901.

Death and legacy

He died in Vineland, New Jersey, in Cumberland County on August 21, 1915, and was buried in Spring Hill Cemetery in Charleston, West Virginia.
His son and namesake was United States Navy Admiral Charles P. Snyder. His great-great-granddaughter is actress Elizabeth McGovern.

See also
United States congressional delegations from West Virginia

Sources

 Online. September 10, 2007.

1847 births
1915 deaths
American consuls
Burials at Spring Hill Cemetery (Charleston, West Virginia)
County prosecuting attorneys in West Virginia
Politicians from Charleston, West Virginia
West Virginia lawyers
19th-century American diplomats
Democratic Party members of the United States House of Representatives from West Virginia
19th-century American politicians
Lawyers from Charleston, West Virginia
19th-century American lawyers